The Regatta class is a class of cruise ships that are owned by Oceania Cruises.

The Regatta-class ships were built in 1998–2000 for Renaissance Cruises as a part of their .  They have a gross tonnage of 30,277 and can accommodate a maximum of 824 passengers in 343 cabins.

When Oceania Cruises was founded in 2002, they took three of the R-class ships: R One which they rechristened , R Two which they rechristened , and R Five which they rechristened .  Oceania referred to these collectively as the Regatta class.

It returned to the fleet In 2014. In 2016, The former R Two was christened and entered service for Oceania as Sirena.   

Note: The R-Class was supposed to be ships for Princess Cruises and they would operate as expedition ships for Princess Expeditions.

References

External links
 

Cruise ship classes